Karina Moya (born September 28, 1973) is a retired hammer thrower from Argentina. She set her personal best throw (63.51 metres) on July 10, 2004 at a meet in Rosario, Santa Fe. Moya also competed in the discus throw and the shot put.

Achievements

References

1973 births
Living people
Argentine female hammer throwers
Argentine female discus throwers
Argentine female shot putters
Athletes (track and field) at the 1995 Pan American Games
Athletes (track and field) at the 1999 Pan American Games
Pan American Games competitors for Argentina
20th-century Argentine women